William Milnor (June 26, 1769 – December 13, 1848) was a member of the United States House of Representatives from Pennsylvania and Mayor of Philadelphia.

William Milnor was born in Philadelphia, Pennsylvania.  He engaged in mercantile pursuits in Philadelphia, and was elected as a Federalist to the Tenth and Eleventh Congresses.  He served as chairman of the United States House Committee on Accounts during the Eleventh Congress.  He was elected to the Fourteenth Congress, and again elected to the Seventeenth Congress and served until his resignation on May 8, 1822.

Milnor elected mayor of Philadelphia on October 20, 1829, and served one year.  He died in Burlington, New Jersey, and was buried in that city's Saint Mary's Episcopal Churchyard.

Milnor was a slaveowner.

Family 
William Milnor was the brother of James Milnor, a lawyer, former member of the U.S. House of Representatives, and rector of St. George’s Chapel in Manhattan, New York.

References

External links
William Milnor at The Political Graveyard

1769 births
1848 deaths
Mayors of Philadelphia
Pennsylvania lawyers
Burials in New Jersey
Federalist Party members of the United States House of Representatives from Pennsylvania
19th-century American lawyers